Igor Vadimovich Ledogorov (9 May 1932 – 10 February 2005) was a Russian actor.

Biography 
Igor Ledogorov was born on 9 May 1932 at Moscow. Since the beginning of The Great Patriotic War he and his family was evacuated to Tashkent. Here he first came into contact with the world of cinema, the crowd participated in the famous picture director Leonid Lukov Two Soldiers.

In 1958, he graduated from Tashkent Polytechnic Institute, where he was a party to the collective dramatic, artistic director was Honored Artist of the RSFSR, Nikolay Khlibko. Also in Tashkent he entered the Theatre and Art Institute  Alexander Ostrovsky, graduating in 1964.

The first significant work was the role of the actor Nikolay Bauman in eponymous historical-biographical film directed by Semyon Tumanov.

On 1967 to 1969 and Ledogorov played Leningrad Theater Lenin Komsomol. Then, having become acquainted with Igor Vladimirov, he moved to  Тheater Lensoviet. There he spent three years playing in productions of Warsaw Melody (from Alisa Freindlich), The Road to Calvary, The Forty-First.

In 1971 Igor Ledogorov came to DATS. On the stage of this theater he performed until 1997 and, until his departure abroad.

In 1997 from the actor after his son Vadim emigrated to New Zealand.

Ledogorov died on 10 February 2005 in Hamilton. He was buried in Cambridge (Hautapu) Public Cemetery.

Filmography 

 1964 — Your Тraces as Vladimir
 1968 —  Nikolay Bauman as Nikolay Bauman
 1970 — The Ballad of Bering and His Friends  as Dmitry Ovtsyn
 1972 — Hot Snow  as Osin, Colonel, Chief of Counterintelligence
 1974 — Georgy Sedov as Georgy Sedov
 1974 — Teens in the Universe as extraterrestrial
 1975 — From Dawn Till Sunset as General Stukovsky
 1976 — The Life and Death of Ferdinand Luce as Bauer
 1977 — The Legend of Til as William the Silent
 1977 — Portrait with Rain  as Anatoly
 1980 — Karl Marx. Die jungen Jahre as Wilhelm Weitling 
 1981 — Per Aspera Ad Astra  as Ambassador Rakan
 1977 — They Were Actors as Ryabinin
 1982 — Tenderness to the Roaring Beast as Donat Borovsky
 1988 — May I Die, God as film director
 1995 — Tribunal as Chairman of the court
 1997 — Hunting Season  as Vertletsky

Honors and awards
 1974 —  State Prize  BSSR   
 1978 —  Vasilyev Brothers State Prize of the RSFSR   
 1979 —  Honored Artist of the RSFSR
 1989 —  People's Artist of the RSFSR

References

External links 
 
 Igor Ledogorov online KinoPoisk
 Igor Ledogorov online RUSactors.ru

1932 births
2005 deaths
Male actors from Moscow
Soviet male film actors
Soviet male stage actors
Socialist realism
People's Artists of the RSFSR
Recipients of the Vasilyev Brothers State Prize of the RSFSR
Recipients of the Byelorussian SSR State Prize
Burials at Hautapu Cemetery